Pollenia paupera is a species of cluster fly in the family Polleniidae.

Distribution
Algeria, Cyprus, France, Greece, Iran, Israel, Italy, Malta, Turkey, Ukraine.

References

Polleniidae
Insects described in 1862
Diptera of Asia
Diptera of Europe
Taxa named by Camillo Rondani